The badminton women's team tournament at the 2010 Asian Games in Guangzhou took place from 13 November to 15 November at Tianhe Gymnasium.

Ten teams entered for the tournament but Macau didn't show up against China women's team in quarterfinal round and therefore lost by walkover.

China won the gold medal by beating Thailand 3–0 in the final at Tianhe Gymnasium on 15 November 2010. It was the fourth consecutive Asian Games gold for China's women in the event. World number one Wang Xin lost the first game to Ratchanok Intanon but rallied to take the opener 20–22 21–17 21–14.  In the next bout, Wang Shixian beat Nitchaon Jindapol 21–13, 21–12, to make the team result 2–0. There was no such drama in last matches when world number six Jiang Yanjiao beat Sapsiree Taerattanachai 21–15, 21–10.

South Korea and Indonesia shared the bronze medal. South Korea lost 3–0 to China in the semifinal while Indonesia outplayed by Thailand 3–1.

Schedule
All times are China Standard Time (UTC+08:00)

Results
Legend
WO — Won by walkover

Round of 16

Quarterfinals

Semifinals

Final

Non-participating athletes

References 
 Bracket
Asian Games Complete Results

External links 
 Official site

Badminton at the 2010 Asian Games